The String Quintet No. 5 in D major, K. 593 was written by Wolfgang Amadeus Mozart in 1790. Like all of Mozart's string quintets, it is a "viola quintet" in that it is scored for string quartet and an extra viola (two violins, two violas and cello).

Movements
The work is in standard four movement form:

According to the Neue Mozart-Ausgabe, the finale was printed, and known for some time, in an inauthentic edition, in which its main theme, originally a descending chromatic scale fragment, was replaced in most of its appearances in the movement by a more complicated zigzag ("Zickzackform") themelet.

References

External links

Performance by the Orion String Quartet and Ida Kavafian (viola) from the Isabella Stewart Gardner Museum in MP3 format

String quintets by Wolfgang Amadeus Mozart
Compositions in D major
1790 compositions